Sir William Robert Ferdinand Mount, 3rd Baronet, FRSL (born 2 July 1939), is a British writer, novelist, and columnist for The Sunday Times, as well as a political commentator.

Life
Ferdinand Mount, brought up by his parents in the isolated village of Chitterne, Wiltshire, began school at the age of eight. He then attended Greenways and Sunningdale School before Eton College, after which he went to Christ Church, Oxford.

Mount worked at Conservative Party HQ as Head of the Number 10 Policy Unit during 1982–83, when Margaret Thatcher was Prime Minister and played a significant part in devising the 1983 general election manifesto.

Mount is regarded as being on the one-nation or "wet" side of the Conservative Party. He succeeded his uncle, Sir William Mount, in the family title as 3rd baronet in 1993, but prefers to remain known as Ferdinand Mount.

For eleven years (1991–2002) he was editor of the Times Literary Supplement, and then became a regular contributor to Standpoint magazine. He wrote for The Sunday Times, and in 2005 joined The Daily Telegraph as a commentator. He writes for the London Review of Books.

Mount has written novels, including a six-volume novel sequence called Chronicle of Modern Twilight, centring on a low-key character, Gus Cotton; the title alludes to the sequence A Chronicle of Ancient Sunlight by Henry Williamson, and another sequence entitled Tales of History and Imagination. Volume 5, entitled 'Fairness', was long-listed for the Man Booker Prize in 2001.

Sir Ferdinand serves as Chairman of the Friends of the British Library and was elected a Fellow of the Royal Society of Literature (FRSL) in 1991.

Family
The only son of Robert (Robin) Mount, an army officer and amateur steeplechase jockey, and Lady Julia Pakenham, youngest daughter of the 5th Earl of Longford, KP, Ferdinand inherited the baronetcy from his uncle Lt-Col. Sir William Mount, Bt, TD, DL, who died in 1993, having had three daughters, including Mary Cameron, JP (b. 1934), mother of David Cameron, former Prime Minister (and Conservative Party leader).

The Labour politician Frank Pakenham, 7th Earl of Longford, and his brother,Edward Pakenham, 6th Earl of Longford, were Mount's maternal uncles. His maternal aunts were the writers Lady Mary Clive, Lady Pansy Lamb and Lady Violet Powell, the wife of author Anthony Powell.

Sir Ferdinand and his wife, Julia née Lucas, live in Islington; he and Lady Mount have three surviving children, William (b. 1969 and heir apparent to the title), Harry (b. 1971, a journalist) and Mary (b. 1972, an editor who is married to Indian writer Pankaj Mishra).

Works

Very Like a Whale (1967), novel
The Theatre of Politics (1972),
The Man Who Rode Ampersand (1975), novel, (Chronicle of Modern Twilight – 1)
The Clique (1978), novel
The Subversive Family: An Alternative History of Love and Marriage (1982)
The Practice of Liberty (1986), novel
The Selkirk Strip (1987), novel, (Chronicle of Modern Twilight – 2)
Of Love and Asthma (1991), novel, (Chronicle of Modern Twilight – 3), Winner of the Hawthornden Prize 1992
Communism: A Times Literary Supplement Companion (1992), editor
The British Constitution Now: Recovery or Decline? (1992)
The Recovery of the Constitution (Sovereignty Lectures) (1992)
Umbrella: A Pacific Tale (1994), novel, (Tales of History and Imagination – 1)
The Liquidator (1995), novel, (Chronicle of Modern Twilight – 4)
Jem (and Sam): A Revenger's Tale (1999), novel, (Tales of History and Imagination – 2) 
Fairness (2001), novel, (Chronicle of Modern Twilight – 5)
Mind the Gap: Class in Britain Now (2004) 
Heads You Win (2004), novel, (Chronicle of Modern Twilight – 6)
Private Life 21st Century (2006)
The Condor's Head (2007), novel
Cold Cream: My Early Life and Other Mistakes (2009), memoir
Full Circle: How the Classical World Came Back to Us (2010)
The New Few: Power and Inequality in Britain Now or A Very British Oligarchy (2012)
The Tears of the Rajas: Mutiny, Money and Marriage in India 1805–1905 (2015)
English Voices: Lives, Landscapes, Laments (2016)
Prime Movers:  From Pericles to Gandhi (2018)
Kiss Myself Goodbye: The Many Lives of Aunt Munca (2020)
Making Nice (2021), novel

See also

 Mount baronets

References

External links
 www.spectator.co.uk
 www.burkespeerage.com

 

1939 births
Living people
People from Islington (district)
People educated at Greenways School
People educated at Sunningdale School
People educated at Eton College
Alumni of Christ Church, Oxford
20th-century British novelists
21st-century British novelists
Baronets in the Baronetage of the United Kingdom
British male journalists
British male novelists
British memoirists
British non-fiction writers
Daily Mail journalists
The Daily Telegraph people
London Evening Standard people
The Sunday Times people
Conservative Party (UK) politicians
Fellows of the Royal Society of Literature
Ferdinand